Erhard Körner was a German luger who competed in the late 1930s. He won a silver medal in the men's doubles event at the 1939 European luge championships in Reichenberg, Czechoslovakia (now Liberec, Czech Republic).

References
 FIL-Luge.org list of European luge champions  - Accessed January 31, 2008.
 List of European luge champions 

German male lugers
Year of birth missing
Year of death missing